Lighthouse Beach is a surf lifesaving patrolled beach in East Ballina, NSW, Australia. Located in between Shelley Beach and The North Wall, Ballina, this beach is approximately 500m long and 50m wide.

Beaches of New South Wales